Monika Mária Rónaszéki-Keresztes (née Keresztes; born May 17, 1962) is a Hungarian educator and politician, member of the National Assembly (MP) for Erzsébetváros (Budapest Constituency IX) between 2010 and 2014. She was also appointed a vice mayor of Erzsébetváros (District VII, Budapest) in October 2010.

She was a member of the Committee on Youth, Social, Family, and Housing Affairs from May 14, 2010, to May 5, 2014, and Committee on Human Rights, Minority, Civic and Religious Affairs from February 18, 2013, to May 5, 2014. She was defeated by Lajos Oláh (DK) at Budapest Constituency V in the 2014 parliamentary election.

Personal life
She married electric engineer Balázs Rónaszéki in 1983. They have together seven children - Bernadett, Regina, Álmos, Mónika, Balázs, József, János Zsigmond. She is member of Fidesz since 2003.

References

1962 births
Living people
Hungarian educators
Hungarian women educators
Fidesz politicians
Members of the National Assembly of Hungary (2010–2014)
Women members of the National Assembly of Hungary
Politicians from Budapest
21st-century Hungarian women politicians